Halgerda elegans is a species of sea slug, a dorid nudibranch, shell-less marine gastropod mollusks in the family Discodorididae.

Distribution
Reported from the Philippines and New South Wales, Australia.

References

Discodorididae
Gastropods described in 1905